The 2004 British motorcycle Grand Prix was the ninth round of the 2004 MotoGP Championship. It took place on the weekend of 23–25 July 2004 at the Donington Park circuit.

MotoGP classification

250 cc classification

125 cc classification

Championship standings after the race (motoGP)

Below are the standings for the top five riders and constructors after round nine has concluded.

Riders' Championship standings

Constructors' Championship standings

 Note: Only the top five positions are included for both sets of standings.

References

British motorcycle Grand Prix
British
Motorcycle Grand Prix